Emmanuel Kumah (born 9 February 2000) is a Ghanaian professional footballer who plays as a midfielder for Wieczysta Kraków.

Career

Kumah started. his career with Ghanaian second division side Tudu Mighty Jets. Before the second half of 2018–19, he was sent on loan to Wisła Kraków in the Polish top flight, where he made 6 appearances and scored 0 goals, after trialing for Spanish La Liga club Málaga, Austria Wien in Austria, German Bundesliga team Hoffenheim, and almost signing for Bologna in the Italian Serie A. On 25 April 2019, he debuted for Wisła Kraków during a 1–2 loss to Zagłębie Sosnowiec. Before the second half of 2019–20, Kumah signed for Polish sixth division outfit Wieczysta Kraków.

References

External links
 

2000 births
Living people
Ghanaian footballers
Association football midfielders
Tudu Mighty Jets FC players
Wisła Kraków players
Ekstraklasa players
IV liga players
Expatriate footballers in Poland
Ghanaian expatriate footballers
Ghanaian expatriate sportspeople in Poland